Merritte Weber Ireland (May 31, 1867 – July 5, 1952) was the 23rd U.S. Army Surgeon General, serving in that capacity from October 4, 1918 to May 31, 1931.

Early life and education
Ireland was born on May 31, 1867 in Columbia City, Indiana, a town in the upper end of the Wabash Valley in Whitley County, Indiana.  His father, Dr. Martin Ireland, was born in Chillicothe, Ohio, and his mother, whose maiden name was Sarah Fellers, came from Waynesboro, Virginia.

He graduated from the Detroit College of Medicine, receiving an M.D. degree in 1890. The following year was spent in Jefferson Medical College where again he earned an M.D. degree in 1891.

Military career
He served as a surgeon with the 45th U.S. Volunteer Infantry in 1899 and honorably discharged in 1901.

In 1903, he was commissioned as a surgeon into the Medical Corps.

During World War I, Ireland served as chief surgeon of the American Expeditionary Forces. He departed France in October 1918 and was succeeded by his deputy, Walter McCaw. He was awarded the Army Distinguished Service Medal for his service during the war, woth the medal's citation reading:

He served as Surgeon General from October 4, 1918 to May 31, 1931.

Death and legacy
Ireland died on July 5, 1952.

Legacy
Ireland's papers are held at the National Library of Medicine.
Ireland Army Community Hospital, located at Fort Knox, Kentucky, was built in 1957 and named in his honor.

Military awards
Major General Ireland's ribbon bar:

Dates of rank

Source: Army Register, 1932

References

Army bio

People from Columbia City, Indiana
1867 births
1952 deaths
Recipients of the Distinguished Service Medal (US Army)
Burials at Arlington National Cemetery
United States Army generals of World War I
United States Army generals
Surgeons General of the United States Army